"Candy Girl" is the debut single by New Edition from their debut album Candy Girl. It was released as a single in late February 1983 and the song hit number one on the UK Singles Chart, becoming the 31st-best-selling single of the year. It also peaked at number 1 on the Hot Black Singles chart, passing Michael Jackson’s song "Beat It" on May 14, 1983.

"Candy Girl" established New Edition as a bubblegum pop group with stylings from contemporary R&B.

History
New Edition was first discovered and mentored by their manager Brooke Payne. He entered them in a local talent show where they met songwriter/producer Maurice Starr  who wrote "Candy Girl" for the group, envisioning them as a 1980s answer to the Jackson 5. Ralph Tresvant was positioned as the lead singer, because Starr considered his high tenor as reminiscent of a younger Michael Jackson, while having members Ricky Bell and Bobby Brown sharing alternate leads.

The 12" version features producers Starr and Michael Jonzun doing some additional instrumentation in the outro.

Release and reaction
Released as a single in February 1983 before the album was released, the song made a slow ascent up the chart, peaking on June 25, 1983, at number 46 on the Billboard Hot 100 singles chart singles chart, and number 1 on the R&B singles chart in the US. It was most successful in the UK, where it peaked at number 1 for one week in May 1983.

Personnel
Ralph Tresvant: lead and background vocals; rap
Bobby Brown: lead and background vocals; rap
Ricky Bell: lead and background vocals; rap
Michael Bivins: rap and background vocals
Ronnie DeVoe: rap and background vocals

Charts

Weekly charts

Year-end charts

Certifications

References

1982 songs
1983 debut singles
Bubblegum pop songs
New Edition songs
Number-one singles in South Africa
Songs written by Maurice Starr
Songs written by Michael Jonzun
UK Singles Chart number-one singles
Warlock Records singles